Pseudomonas knackmussii is a Gram-negative, polarly flagellated, motile, short rod bacterium isolated from a sewage treatment plant in Göttingen, Germany. It is the first bacterium used to study the degradation of haloaromatic compounds. It is named after Hans-Joachim Knackmuss. The type strain is DSM 6978.

References

External links
Type strain of Pseudomonas knackmussii at BacDive -  the Bacterial Diversity Metadatabase

Pseudomonadales
Bacteria described in 2007